Isaac Adams (August 16, 1802 – July 19, 1883) was an American inventor and politician. He served in the  Massachusetts Senate and invented the Adams Power Press, which revolutionized the printing industry. His son, Isaac Adams Jr., invented the first commercial process for nickel electroplating.

Biography
Adams was born in Rochester, New Hampshire, the son of Benjamin Adams and Elizabeth (Horne) Adams. His education was limited, and at an early age he was an operative in a cotton factory. Afterward he learned the trade of cabinet maker, but in 1824 went to Boston and sought work in a machine shop.

In 1828 he invented the Adams printing press, which he improved in 1834, and it was introduced in 1830 as "Adams Power Press". The machine "worked a revolution in the art of printing," and beginning in 1836, became the leading machine used in book printing for much of the nineteenth century, and was distributed worldwide. It substantially reduced the cost of book production, and made books more widely available.

With his brother Seth, a noted sugar refiner, Adams engaged in the manufacture of printing presses, sugar mills, steam engines (stationary and marine), steam boilers and other machines, and formed the company I. & S. Adams in 1836.

He was a member of the Massachusetts Senate in 1840, and the Emigrant Aid Company. His last years were spent in retirement. He died on July 19, 1883.

References

Sources

Further reading

 
 
  See page 261 and the accompanying footnote 125.
  Description of factory at what was Dorchester Neck, now Ward XII of the City of Boston.

External links
 
 

	

1802 births
1883 deaths
People from Rochester, New Hampshire
19th-century American inventors
Bookbinders
Massachusetts state senators
19th-century American politicians
Inventors from New Hampshire